Sauganash Hotel (originally Eagle Exchange Tavern) is a former hotel; regarded as the first hotel in Chicago, Illinois.  Built in 1831, it was located at Wolf Point in the present day Loop community area at the intersection of the north, south and main branches of the Chicago River.  The location at West Lake Street and North Wacker Drive (formerly Market Street) was designated a Chicago Landmark on November 6, 2002.  The hotel changed proprietors often in its twenty-year existence and briefly served as Chicago's first theater.  It was named after Sauganash, an interpreter in the British Indian Department.

History

Mark and Monique Beaubien, the owners and builders of the hotel, were French Indian traders. In 1826 they moved to Chicago on the advice of Mark's elder brother Jean, an established trader who lived next to Fort Dearborn. The Beaubiens settled in a small cabin on Wolf's Point and also traded with the Native Americans and other travelers to the growing settlement. They built a tavern on the east bank of the south branch of the Chicago River at the point where the north and south branches meet.

The tavern initially was named the Eagle Exchange Tavern. In 1831, they added a frame to the log structure to create Chicago's first hotel, the Sauganash Hotel.  When completed, it was one of only two residential structures on the south side of the main branch of the Chicago River, the other being that of his brother, Col. Jean B. Beaubien.  The settlement had only twelve houses at the time.  The hostelry immediately became famous, and when reconstructed later became the city's largest and finest hotel.  Immediately adjacent to the hotel's public bar was Chicago's first drug store.
The Greek Revival trim of the new hotel contrasted with the other eleven buildings of Chicago. The symmetry of its facade was typical to contemporary Greek Revival practiced on the East Coast. Juliette Kinzie, who came to Chicago from Connecticut in 1831, described it as "a pretentios white two-story building, with bright blue wood shutters, the admiration of all the little circle at Wolf Point".  The hostelry's clientele transcended race, with natives and settlers enjoying each other's company.

The flow of travelers and settlers intensified with the end of the Black Hawk War in 1832. In 1833 the hotel housed election of the first town trustees of the newly formed Town of Chicago. Beaubien kept the Hotel until 1834 and during his ownership he regularly entertained guests with his violin. On August 18, 1835, two years after the Potawatomi natives signed the treaty agreeing to be moved to a reservation beyond the Mississippi River in northwestern Missouri, they selected 800 braves to perform their last war dance parade on a path that passed in front of the hotel.

In 1835, a Mr. Davis assumed control of the hotel, which subsequently had a series of proprietors.  The building briefly served as Chicago's first theater, and hosted the first Chicago Theatre company in November 1837 in an abandoned dining room. By 1839, it returned to service as a hotel, but was destroyed by fire in 1851, and subsequently torn down. The Wigwam was built in its place nine years later.

Honoree
Billy Caldwell "Sauganash", who served as an interpreter for the Indian Agents, was the honoree of the hotel.  Born in approximately 1780, "Sauganash" was half native-american whose father was Colonel Caldwell, an Irish officer in the British Army stationed at Detroit; his mother was a Pottawatomi.  He was schooled at a Jesuit school in Detroit, where he learned English and French.  Caldwell learned several Indian dialects.  Billy Caldwell's Indian Name was "Straight Tree", but he was known by "Sauganash", meaning Englishman in the Potawatomi language. As a warrior, Sauganash was under the influence of Tecumseh until his death in 1813, and he rose to the level of a Captain in the British Indian Department during the War of 1812.

Theater
In 1834 (three years before Chicago incorporated as a city), the hotel hosted the first professional public performance in Chicago at a cost of $.50 ($ today) for adults and $.25 for children.  The show promised a wide variety of talents including ventriloquism.  In the following two years, several traveling showmen performed at the hotel.  In 1837, the Chicago Theater, which was the first local theater company, set up shop in the hotel's abandoned dining room.  Co-managers Harry Isherwood and Alexander McKinzie procured an amusement license for the company from the city council, and it began performing a different billed show every night starting in late October or early November for approximately six weeks.  The plays included titles The Idiot Witness, The Stranger, and The Carpenter of Rouen. Production of The Stranger took place in the dining room of the hotel. Following a six-week engagement, the company went on tour until the following spring, when it returned to a different local venue.

See also

References

Hotel buildings completed in 1831
Former buildings and structures in Chicago
History of Chicago
Chicago Landmarks
Defunct hotels in Chicago
Burned buildings and structures in the United States